Monty Python Sings is a compilation album of songs by English comedy troupe Monty Python. Released in 1989 to celebrate their 20th anniversary, it contains popular songs from their previous albums and films. The album was dedicated to the memory of founding member Graham Chapman, who died two months before its release.

Songs

The album contained two previously unreleased tracks: "Oliver Cromwell" (originally performed by John Cleese on the 1960s radio series I'm Sorry I'll Read That Again) was recorded during sessions for Monty Python's Contractual Obligation Album in 1980, while a studio recording of Terry Gilliam's live standard "I've Got Two Legs" was recorded in 1974 for the Drury Lane shows, where it was to be mimed onstage, but discarded once Gilliam decided to perform it live instead. The album also has a longer version of "Medical Love Song," with added instrumentation and previously unheard verses which mix out Eric Idle's guide vocals and push Graham Chapman's lead vocal to the forefront. The remixes of "Sit on My Face" and the extended "Henry Kissinger" from The Final Rip Off were also used, as well as a new mix of "Bruces' Philosophers Song (Bruces' Song)" and a remix of the 1975 George Harrison-produced single version of "The Lumberjack Song", featuring some alternate vocal takes. This was the first compilation to include tracks from the Life of Brian and The Meaning of Life soundtracks, albeit in remixed form. "Every Sperm Is Sacred" is the extended version, previously only available on the B-side of the 7-inch single of "Galaxy Song".

Artwork
The cover design by Terry Gilliam marked his first original album artwork since 1977's Instant Record Collection. The original vinyl release contained a booklet featuring illustrated lyrics to all the songs.

Reissues
Although the album did not chart on its original 1989 release, it was re-promoted following the successful reissue of "Always Look on the Bright Side of Life" in 1991, when it reached No. 62 in the UK Albums Chart.

On 30 June 2014, the album was re-released as Monty Python Sings (Again) on CD and as a digital download, expanded with six additional recordings: three out-takes from Monty Python's Contractual Obligation Album and three new tracks from Eric Idle, recorded for inclusion in the team's reunion shows Monty Python Live (Mostly). A deluxe edition in both formats also included the 1970 Monty Python's Flying Circus album. This version of the album reached No. 35 in the UK Albums Chart.

To celebrate the team's 50th anniversary, a double vinyl album set of Monty Python Sings (Again) was released on 4 October 2019, now including the Stephen Hawking version of "Galaxy Song," first released as a limited edition 7-inch single for Record Store Day on 18 April 2015.

Track listing

Monty Python Sings (1989)

Monty Python Sings (Again) (2014)
New to the 2014 'Revised Edition' are tracks 3, 13, 18, 19, 26 and 30.

2019 LP version bonus track

Personnel

Performers
Graham Chapman
John Cleese
Terry Gilliam
Eric Idle
Terry Jones
Michael Palin

Additional performers
Sonia Jones ("Brian Song", "The Silly Walk Song", "Nudge Rap/Blackmail")
John Du Prez ("The Silly Walk Song")
Bob Saker ("The Silly Walk Song")
Tim Whitnall ("The Silly Walk Song")
Jamie Lisa Jacquemin ("The Silly Walk Song", "Nudge Rap/Blackmail")

Technical
John Du Prez – arranger ("The Silly Walk Song", "Finland", "Medical Love Song", "I'm So Worried", "I Like Chinese", "The Naval Medley", "Sit on My Face", "Never Be Rude to an Arab", "Decomposing Composers", "Henry Kissinger", "Rainy Day in Berlin", "Lousy Song"), producer ("The Naval Medley"), mixing ("The Naval Medley") 
Neil Innes – arranger
John Altman  – arranger
Mike McNaught – arranger
Fred Tomlinson – arranger ("Money Song", "Spam", "Lumberjack Song")
Eric Idle – producer
Andre Jacquemin – producer, engineer, mixing
James Saunders – recording assistant
Kath James – co-ordinator
Kay Gee Bee Music Ltd. – illustration
TDC – layout

Holly Gilliam – project coordinator (2014 edition)
Terry Gilliam – cover artwork, packaging design, layout (2014 edition)
Ric Lipson – packaging design, layout (2014 edition)
Darren Evans – additional artwork and design (2014 edition)
Andy Gotts – Monty Python group photo (2014 edition)
Robert Ross – notes (2014 edition)
Giselle Berger – notes transcription (2014 edition)
Sean Magee – mastering (2014 edition)

References

Sings
1989 compilation albums
Virgin Records compilation albums
Albums with cover art by Terry Gilliam